The Mughals (also spelled Moghul or Mogul) are a number of culturally related clans of Indo-Turkic people in North India, Pakistan and Bangladesh. They claim they are descended from the various Central Asian Mongolic and Turkic tribes and Persians that settled in the region. The term Mughal (or Moghul in Persian) literally means Mongol.

History and origin
During the time of the Mongol Empire in the 13–14th century, the army of Genghis Khan swept across Central Asia and into Persia. Over subsequent centuries, descendants of these soldiers inter-married with Persian and Turkic Muslims, converted to Islam and adopted the Persian language and culture. Conflict between India and the Mongols has been recorded from the time of Genghis Khan to Timur to Babur. The Delhi Sultanate (1206–1526) faced nearly annual Mongol onslaughts from 1297 to 1303 when the Doab was sacked and what is now Pakistan was under continual Mongol occupation. Indian and Indo-Persian sources referred to the invaders as Mughal, derived from Mongol. During the 16th century, the Turko-Mongol conqueror Babur brought most of northern India under Mughal rule, establishing an empire that would endure until the mid-19th century. As the ruling class, the Mughals lived mainly in cities along with other Muslims. They were traditionally known for their skill at horsemanship, archery, wrestling and a meat-heavy diet.

The court itself does not now consist, as originally of real Mongols, but a medley of Turks, Turkman/Uzbeks, Arabs and Persians or descendants of all these classes; known, as said before by the general appellation Mughal by the Muslims of native origin.

As early as the 17th century, the term Mughal covered a large number of groups. Generally, all Central Asian immigrants to India, whether Uzbek, Chughtai or Gürkani Türks, further Timurids, Barlas, Kipchak, Kazakhs, Turkman, Kyrgyz, Uyghurs or Mongol, were referred to as Mughal. The term was also used for later immigrants from Iran and Turkey, such as the famous Qizilbash community.

In North India, the term Mughal refers to one of the four social groups that are referred to as the Ashraaf in Pakistan, a number of tribal groupings such as the Tanoli in North West Frontier Province and the Gheba and Kassar in Punjab claim Barlas Mughal ancestry. Sir Denzil Ibbetson, the eminent British student of Punjabi tribal structures, noted a tendency among many tribes of the Pothohar and Upper Hazara regions of Northern Pakistan to claim Barlas Mughal ancestry.

In North India 
In North India, the term Mughal refers Gürkani Türk or Timurids. They are also sometimes referred as Chughtais or Chagatai Türks named after Chagatai Turkic language spoken by the Barlas and other Central Asian tribes. But one of the social groups that are Claim to as the Ashraaf.

In Uttar Pradesh 

In Uttar Pradesh (UP), their main clans are the Chagatai Turks, Gurkānī or Timurids, Barlas, Qazilbash, Turkmen, Turk, Uzbek, Kayı. The Mughals of Uttar Pradesh belong to the Sunni  sects, with the majority belonging to the Sunni Hanafi sect. Sunni Mughals are usually orthodox in their religious outlook. The Mughal of Awadh trace their entry into the region to the year 1750. The Mughal of UP are an endogamous community, marrying within their own community, or in communities of a similar status such as the Syeds, Shaikh (Siddiqui, Farooqui, Usmani, and Nomani etc.), Pathan, Shamsi, Kidwai and Muslim Rajput. Some of these group immigrated to Uttar Pradesh, India as early as 1200 AD during the Delhi Sultanate. The rural Mughals are farmers, and many own orchards, especially mango orchards, while in towns they are engaged in trade, handicrafts. Carpet weaving is an activity particularly associated with the UP Mughals.

The Turk community of Sambhal identify as a Biradari, literally translating to "brotherhood", which is the word used for a social unit based on kinship such as tribe or clan. The chief of the Biradari is the "Sardar", who is usually an elder man annually elected as the greatest man in the Biradari. Decisions on important matters are taken only after consulting the Biradari, and once taken binding on every member.

Present circumstances

The Turks or Gurkanis or Mughals live in northern India, mainly in Delhi, Ghaziabad, Amroha, Moradabad, Rampur, Sambal, Bijnor, Muzzafer Nagar and Meerut in UP. They also are in Udhamsingh Nagar, Nainital, Haldwani and Dehradun in Uttrakhand, Bhopal, Junagarh in Gujarat. 

The community had traditionally served as soldiers in the armies of the various Turkic dynasties which ruled Indian subcontinent. They were and still are a community of small to medium-sized farmers. A good many are also traders. Like other Gujarati Muslims, they have a caste association known as the Jamat, which acts both as a welfare organization and an instrument of social control.

In Bangladesh 
The people of Mughal descent in Bangladesh often use Khan or Mirza as a family title, their ancestors who originate in Turkestan or Mongolia came as soldiers of the Mughal empire along with the Pathan soldiers who also use Khan as a family title, via Afghanistan came to Bengal.

See also 
 Khan Mughal
 Moghol people
 Turco-Mongol tradition

References 

Mongol peoples
Turkic peoples
Surnames
Punjabi tribes

Tribes of India
Tribes of Pakistan
Indian people of Mongolian descent
Indian people of Turkic descent
Pakistani people of Mongol descent
Pakistani people of Turkic descent